SLH may refer to:

 Cheboygan County Airport, Michigan, US, FAA code
 Small Luxury Hotels of the World, partners of Hyatt
 SLH Transport, Kingston, Ontario, Canada
 Stockton-Lindquist House, DeLand, Florida, US